Sami Abbod is a Yemeni international footballer who played at 2011 AFC Asian Cup qualification.  He played in all three games Yemen competed in, scoring a goal against Japan on June 1, 2011. Abbod was also a member of the Al-Tilal SC, who won the Yemeni President Cup in 2010.

References

Living people
Yemeni footballers
Association football midfielders
Yemen international footballers
Yemeni League players
Al-Wehda SC (Aden) players
Hassan Abyan players
Al-Tilal SC players

Year of birth missing (living people)